Thomas Kruska competed for West Germany in the men's standing volleyball event at the 1988 Summer Paralympics, where he won a gold medal.

See also 
 West Germany at the 1988 Summer Paralympics

References 

Living people
Year of birth missing (living people)
Place of birth missing (living people)
German men's volleyball players
Paralympic gold medalists for West Germany
Paralympic medalists in volleyball
Volleyball players at the 1988 Summer Paralympics
Medalists at the 1988 Summer Paralympics
Paralympic volleyball players of Germany
20th-century German people